Aster DM Healthcare Limited is a publicly-traded multinational for-profit hospital conglomerate healthcare company founded by Azad Moopen in 1987. The company has its corporate headquarters in Dubai, UAE, and is registered in Bangalore, India. Aster DM Healthcare currently operates hospitals, medical centres, diagnostic centres, laboratories and pharmacies in six GCC countries and India. The corporation works in a variety of economic sectors through its brands Aster, Medcare, and Access.

History

Aster DM Healthcare was founded in 1987 in Dubai, the United Arab Emirates, by Azad Moopen, a doctor turned entrepreneur. The company is a private sector healthcare provider in the Middle East. The India registered healthcare conglomerate covers an array of healthcare verticals, including hospitals, clinics, pharmacies and healthcare consultancy service.

In February 2022, Aster had also signed an agreement with Novartis to collaborate on digital transformation and clinical research.

In March 2022, the company entered into a partnership with Siemens Healthineers for technology upgradation and digital optimization in its GCC and UAE facilities.

Aster Medcity
 
Aster Medcity is the flagship hospital of Aster DM Healthcare. It is located in Kochi, Kerala and was opened in 2015. At present, it is a 1745 bed quaternary care healthcare centre in a 40-acre campus.

Business expansion
In May 2011, Aster DM Healthcare opened its first medical centre in Sharjah, United Arab Emirates. The new centre was officially inaugurated by the veteran Indian play back singer K. J. Yesudas and various guests from the Government of Sharjah and Ministry of Health.

In February 2013, Aster DM Healthcare announced the interest of investing in the Philippines' healthcare sector. Initially, the company would start with the establishment of pharmacies and possibly hospitals in the later time. Moopen told reporters in a press conference for the launch of the DM Healthcare Foundation Philippines Inc., which is providing free paediatric cardiac surgery to at least 50 Filipino children in two years. In December, they launched its fifth Access Clinic in Jebel Ali Free Zone, or Jafza South, aimed at catering to the day-to-day healthcare needs of the employees in the neighbourhood.

In April 2014, the company announced the plans to establish help desks in Oman for 2 separate campuses of Aster Medcity, South Asia's largest quaternary care hospitals being set up in Kochi and Thiruvananthapuram in Kerala, India.

In March 2015, the cricketer Sachin Tendulkar opened Aster DM Healthcare's 150th pharmacy in Abu Dhabi. Sachin Tendulkar was the brand ambassador of Aster Pharmacy and CSR activities.

In October 2015, in one of the largest healthcare deals in West Asia, Aster DM Healthcare raised its ownership stake to 97% in Saudi’s Sanad Hospital.

In August 2016, the company has taken over Kavery Medical Institute, Bangaluru, upgraded and renamed it as Aster CMI Hospital, Bangaluru. The facility has 509 beds and multiple centers of excellence. It was inaugurated by cricketer Sachin Tendulkar on 27 August 2016.

In August 2021, Aster DM Healthcare announced further expansion plans in India. Moopen told the PTI that the company would invest about Rs 235 crore in India to add 411 hospital beds in the next 18 months. As of June 2022, Aster DM Healthcare operates 16 hospitals in India.

In March 2022, Aster opened an AI research lab at the Indian Institute of Science campus in Bengaluru. According to Aster DM Healthcare, initially the focus of the facility would be research and development of AI tech for neurology.

On December 10, 2022, on its 35th anniversary, the company announced that its healthcare facilities in the United Arab Emirates had increased to 455 units.

Acquisitions
 
In 2012, Olympus Capital Holdings Asia bought a minority stake in Aster DM Healthcare for about $100 million. The company did not reveal the size of the acquired stake. However, they announced that Olympus Capital Holdings is now Aster DM Healthcare's largest external investor and that its nominees will join the company's board. In May 2014, Olympus Capital Holdings Asia invested another $60 million into the company.

In November 2014, Aster DM Healthcare finalized Bank of America Merrill Lynch, Goldman Sachs and Kotak Mahindra Bank to manage its Rs 1,200-crore initial public offering (IPO) scheduled for early next year. The company plans to sell 10% shares on the bourses though details of the same are not finalized yet. SEBI, the Indian market regulator asked the company to prove the overseas asset networth of the company.

IPO Listing
In February 2018, Aster DM to launched IPO and set price band at Rs180-190 per share.

Subsidiaries 

 The company has 9 subsidiaries and 67 stepdown subsidiaries and 4 associate companies, including:
 Medcare Hospital is the private healthcare provider, operating state-of-the-art hospitals. It includes Medcare Multi-specialty Hospitals in Dubai and Sharjah, Medcare Women & Children Hospital, Medcare Orthopedics and Spine Hospital (MOSH), and 16 medical centers in the UAE.
 Access Clinic offers primary healthcare facilities in the industrial and residential areas in UAE, alongside allied services including X-ray and Laboratory facilities.
 Aster Pharmacy, established in 1989, comprises 200 stores and is one of the largest in the UAE, which provides prescription requirements to customers. In 2020, the organization received the DQA & DSES Award for constant improvements in various departments within 5 years. It is also a two-time winner of the SKEA Awards by the Abu Dhabi Chamber of Commerce & Industry (ADCCI).
 Aster Labs is the diagnostic branch of Aster DM Healthcare. Aster Clinical Lab has launched 2 reference labs, 10 satellite labs and 80 patient experienced centers across Karnataka, Kerala, Maharashtra & Andhra Pradesh.
 Dr. Moopen’s Medical college, formerly known as DM Wayanad Institute of Medical Sciences. The campus has a Nursing and Pharmacy colleges and numerous paramedical courses, and since 2022 academic year provides Post-graduate courses.

Aster Volunteers 
 Aster DM Healthcare announced the launch of the 'Aster Volunteers' programme as part of the milestone 'Aster @30' campaign marking their 30th anniversary. The program aims to benefit communities in the Middle East, Africa, India, and the Philippines through medical and non-medical aid, and comprises over 40,000 volunteers. 
 Aster DM Healthcare Founder Chairman & Managing Director Dr Azad Moopen briefed President Pranab Mukherjee about ‘Aster Emergency App’ in presence of Rajya Sabha Deputy during the launch of Aster Volunteers - Aster Emergency App to provide medical during the 'Golden Hour'.
 Aster Volunteers have finished the construction of 100 "Aster Homes" for the 2018 Kerala flood victims. Shri Pinarayi, the Chief Minister of Kerala, presented the beneficiary with the keys to the 100th home during an event held in Kochi. It marked the completion of the initial handovers of the 255 Aster Homes announced as part of the Rebuild Kerala program.

Aster Labs
 
[Aster Labs] is the diagnostic branch of Aster DM Healthcare. Aster Clinical Lab has launched in 2019 with a Gloabl reference lab at Bengaluru, 20 satellite labs and 190+ patient experienced centers across Karnataka, Kerala, Maharashtra, Tamil Nadu, Telangana & Andhra Pradesh.

See also
 Health care provider

References

External links
 

Companies established in 1987
Health care companies of India
Health care companies of the United Arab Emirates
Emirati companies established in 1987
Health care companies established in 1987
Hospital networks in India
Companies listed on the National Stock Exchange of India
Companies listed on the Bombay Stock Exchange